Badre Alam (born 7 May 1992) is an Indian first-class cricketer who plays for Mumbai.

References

External links
 

1992 births
Living people
Indian cricketers
Mumbai cricketers
People from Azamgarh